Tomasz Jarzębowski (born 16 October 1978) is a Polish former footballer. His position on the pitch was central midfield. He has also made two appearances for the Poland national football team.

Achievements 

2001/2002 - Polish champion with Legia Warsaw
2001/2002 - winner of Polish League Cup with Legia Warsaw

References

External links
 

1978 births
Living people
Polish footballers
Legia Warsaw players
GKS Bełchatów players
Arka Gdynia players
Wigry Suwałki players
Ekstraklasa players
Poland international footballers
Footballers from Warsaw
Association football midfielders